Hamriyah is a village in Muscat, in northeastern Oman.

This should not be confused with Hamriyah Port, Sharjah or Al Hamriya Port, Dubai.

References

Populated places in the Muscat Governorate